Professor Makame Mbarawa is a Tanzanian CCM politician and a nominated Member of Parliament.

He served as the Minister of Communication, Science & Technology from 2010 to 2015. He thereafter served as the Minister of Water and Irrigation in the Magufuli administration for eleven days before being transferred to head the infrastructure docket.

References

1961 births
Living people
Chama Cha Mapinduzi MPs
Tanzanian MPs 2010–2015
Tanzanian MPs 2015–2020
Nominated Tanzanian MPs
Government ministers of Tanzania
University of New South Wales alumni
Academic staff of Tshwane University of Technology
Chama Cha Mapinduzi politicians